Banx & Ranx are a grammy nominated music production duo from Montreal, Quebec,  Canada, formed in 2014. Members Soké (real name Zacharie Raymond) and KNY Factory (real name Yannick Rastogi) are producers, songwriters and remixers. They are currently signed to Universal Music Canada as partners under their independently owned label 31 East. The duo is best known for their hit single, "Answerphone", which reached number five on the UK Singles Chart on 25 May 2018, as well as their 2022 hit "Flowers Need Rain" featuring Preston Pablo, which became a Top 10 hit in Canada.
 
Banx & Ranx's debut track "Lit" was released in March 2017. It was followed by their second single 'Time Bomb' (featuring Lady Leshurr) in May 2017.
 
Their work with other artists has included two remixes for Gorillaz, production and co-writing on Sean Paul's "Crick Neck" (featured on the soundtrack to the Usain Bolt documentary I Am Bolt),  production on Afrobeats musician Fuse ODG's track "Window Seat"; and production and co-writing credits on Nicky Jam's Fénix (nominated for Album of the Year at the Latin Grammy Awards). After their partnership with Universal Music Canada in 2022, they began to produce for the newest generation of Canadian pop talent, including Rêve, Preston Pablo, Zach Zoya, and Sofia Camara. Their pop-EDM track "Headphones" with Rêve peaked at #49 in Canada, while their mellow-House EDM track "Flowers Need Rain" with Preston Pablo was a Canadian Top 10 hit, peaking at #9. Both songs charted on the Canadian Year-End Billboard chart for 2022, at #97 and #32 respectively. 
 
They received a grammy nomination for Sean Paul’s album "Scorcha" and three Juno Award nominations at the Juno Awards of 2023, for Breakthrough Group of the Year, Single of the Year for "Flowers Need Rain", and Jack Richardson Producer of the Year for Rêve's "Ctrl + Alt + Del" and Sean Paul's "Dynamite". They won the award for Breakthrough Group.

Discography

Singles

Songwriting and production credits

Notes

^ Soké & KNY Factory received individual writing credits for this song.

Remixes

References

Canadian electronic music groups
Canadian musical duos
Musical groups established in 2014
Musical groups from Montreal
Parlophone artists
Record production duos
2014 establishments in Quebec
Juno Award for Breakthrough Group of the Year winners